Koulo is a settlement in Lifuka island, Tonga. The population is 171.

References

Populated places in Haʻapai